This is a list of the French Singles & Airplay Chart Reviews/SNEP Top 50 Singles number-ones of 1984.

Summary

Singles chart

On November 1984, IFOP affiliated MEDEF and established The Official French Singles Chart under the Syndicat National de l'Édition Phonographique (SNEP). The first official chart was on the issue week of November 4, 1984. There was no official chart before this date, but reviews from IFOP since the music industry was created in France in 1922.

See also
1984 in music
List of number-one hits (France)
List of artists who reached number one on the French Singles Chart

References

1984 in French music
1984 record charts
Lists of number-one songs in France